Kymmene may refer to:

 Kymmene River
 Kymmene Valley
 Kymmene Corporation

See also 
 Kymi (disambiguation)